
This is a list of aircraft in numerical order of manufacturer followed by alphabetical order beginning with 'M'.

Mi

MIAG-Dietrich 
 MIAG-Dietrich MD 12

Miami Maid 
(Miami Aircraft Corp (Pres: Joseph M Smoot), Miami, FL)
 Miami Maid Amphibian MM-200?
 Miami Maid MM-201 Flying Boat

Miazga 
(Michael Miazga, Glenville, CT)
 Miazga B-185

Micco 
(Micco Aircraft Co (Fdr: Chief James Billie; Pres: F DeWitt Beckett), Fort Pierce, FL)
 Micco SP20

Micro Aviation
 Micro Aviation Bat Hawk

Michelstadt 
(Flugzeugbau Michelstadt)
 Michelstadt Maikäfer (DFS)

Michigan 
(Michigan Aircraft Co, 13210 French Rd, Detroit, MI)
 Michigan Aircraft 1 a.k.a. Breese-Dallas X
 Michigan TM-5 a.k.a. Breese-Dallas X

Micro Aviation 
(Micro Aviation New Zealand Limited, Hamilton, New Zealand)
Micro Aviation B22 Bantam

Micro-Aviation 
 Micro-Aviation RG.501 Air Club

Microjet 
(Microjet SA)
 Microjet 200

Microleve 
 Microleve Corsário
 Microleve Echo 2000RG
 Microleve P96 Golf
 Microleve P92 Echo
 Microleve ML 450
 Microleve ML-500 T

Microlight Aviation 
 Microlight Aviation Vampire-MKI
 Microlight Aviation Super Genie

Micronautix
 Micronautix Triton

Midwest 
(Midwest Engineering & Design)
(Shawnee, KS)
 Midwest Hornet
 Midwest Questar Arrowstar
 Midwest Questar Open Aire
 Midwest Questar Sport
 Midwest Questar XLS
 Midwest Zodiac Talon-Turbine

Midwest Microlights 
 Midwest 1
 Midwest 2 Mercury
 Midwest Tomcat

Miettaux 
(Lucien Miettaux)
 Miettaux Ortolan

Mignet 
(Henri Mignet)
 Mignet HM-1-1
 Mignet HM-1-2
 Mignet HM.2
 Mignet HM.3 'The Dromedary'
 Mignet HM.4
 Mignet HM.5 Planeur brouette
 Mignet HM.6
 Mignet HM.7
 Mignet HM.8
 Mignet HM.14
 Mignet HM.16 Pou-Bébé (Baby Pou)
 Mignet HM.18
 Mignet HM.19
 Mignet HM.210
 Mignet HM.280 Pou-Maquis
 Mignet HM.283
 Mignet HM.290
 Mignet HM.293
 Mignet HM.296
 Mignet HM.310 Estafette
 Mignet HM.320
 Mignet HM.330 Cerisier en Fleurs
 Mignet HM.350
 Mignet HM.351
 Mignet HM.360
 Mignet HM.380
 Mignet HM.390
 Mignet HM.1000 Balerit
 Mignet HM.1100 Cordouan

Mihail 
(Filip Mihail)
 Mihail Stabiloplan III
 Mihail Stabiloplan IV

Mikoyan 
 Mikoyan Project 1.44
 Mikoyan MiG-AT
 Mikoyan MiG-110

Mikoyan-Gurevich 
 Mikoyan-Gurevich MiG-1
 Mikoyan-Gurevich MiG-2
 Mikoyan-Gurevich MiG-3
 Mikoyan-Gurevich MiG-4
 Mikoyan-Gurevich MiG-5
 Mikoyan-Gurevich MiG-6
 Mikoyan-Gurevich MiG-7
 Mikoyan-Gurevich MiG-8
 Mikoyan-Gurevich MiG-9 (1st use) (MiG-3 M-82A)
 Mikoyan-Gurevich MiG-9
 Mikoyan-Gurevich MiG-11
 Mikoyan-Gurevich MiG-13
 Mikoyan-Gurevich MiG-15
 Mikoyan-Gurevich MiG-17
 Mikoyan-Gurevich MiG-19
 Mikoyan-Gurevich MiG-21
 Mikoyan-Gurevich MiG-23 (1st use) (Ye-2A "Faceplate")
 Mikoyan-Gurevich MiG-23 (2nd use) (Ye-8 and MiG-23M – Ye-8 deriv.)
 Mikoyan-Gurevich MiG-23 (3rd use) ("Flogger")
 Mikoyan-Gurevich MiG-23PD (Izdeliye 23-01 "Faithless")
 Mikoyan-Gurevich MiG-25
 Mikoyan-Gurevich MiG-25 PU Foxbat
 Mikoyan-Gurevich MiG-27
 Mikoyan-Gurevich MiG-29
 Mikoyan-Gurevich MiG-31
 Mikoyan-Gurevich MiG-33
 Mikoyan-Gurevich MiG-35
 Mikoyan-Gurevich A
 Mikoyan-Gurevich 2A
 Mikoyan-Gurevich 3A
 Mikoyan-Gurevich 4A
 Mikoyan-Gurevich 5A
 Mikoyan-Gurevich A-144
 Mikoyan-Gurevich D
 Mikoyan-Gurevich 2D
 Mikoyan-Gurevich DIS
 Mikoyan-Gurevich DIS-200
 Mikoyan-Gurevich F
 Mikoyan-Gurevich FF
 Mikoyan-Gurevich FK
 Mikoyan-Gurevich FL
 Mikoyan-Gurevich FN
 Mikoyan-Gurevich FP
 Mikoyan-Gurevich FR
 Mikoyan-Gurevich FS
 Mikoyan-Gurevich FT
 Mikoyan-Gurevich I-1
 Mikoyan-Gurevich I-2
 Mikoyan-Gurevich I-3
 Mikoyan-Gurevich I-5
 Mikoyan-Gurevich I-7
 Mikoyan-Gurevich I-75
 Mikoyan-Gurevich I-200
 Mikoyan-Gurevich I-210
 Mikoyan-Gurevich I-211
 Mikoyan-Gurevich I-220
 Mikoyan-Gurevich I-221
 Mikoyan-Gurevich I-222
 Mikoyan-Gurevich I-224
 Mikoyan-Gurevich I-225
 Mikoyan-Gurevich I-230
 Mikoyan-Gurevich I-231
 Mikoyan-Gurevich I-240
 Mikoyan-Gurevich I-250
 Mikoyan-Gurevich I-260
 Mikoyan-Gurevich I-270
 Mikoyan-Gurevich I-300
 Mikoyan-Gurevich I-301
 Mikoyan-Gurevich I-302
 Mikoyan-Gurevich I-305
 Mikoyan-Gurevich I-307
 Mikoyan-Gurevich I-308
 Mikoyan-Gurevich I-310
 Mikoyan-Gurevich I-312
 Mikoyan-Gurevich I-320 (MiG-9)
 Mikoyan-Gurevich I-320
 Mikoyan-Gurevich I-330
 Mikoyan-Gurevich I-340
 Mikoyan-Gurevich I-350
 Mikoyan-Gurevich I-360
 Mikoyan-Gurevich I-370
 Mikoyan-Gurevich I-380
 Mikoyan-Gurevich I-410
 Mikoyan-Gurevich I-500
 Mikoyan-Gurevich IP-201
 Mikoyan-Gurevich Izdeliye 23-01 (correct designation for MiG-23PD)
 Mikoyan-Gurevich IKh
 Mikoyan-Gurevich ISh
 Mikoyan-Gurevich IT
 Mikoyan-Gurevich Kh
 Mikoyan-Gurevich KhS
 Mikoyan-Gurevich M
 Mikoyan-Gurevich M-15
 Mikoyan-Gurevich M-17
 Mikoyan-Gurevich M-19
 Mikoyan-Gurevich M-21
 Mikoyan-Gurevich N
 Mikoyan-Gurevich PBSh-1
 Mikoyan-Gurevich PBSh-2
 Mikoyan-Gurevich R
 Mikoyan-Gurevich S
 Mikoyan-Gurevich SA
 Mikoyan-Gurevich Samolyot Ye
 Mikoyan-Gurevich SD
 Mikoyan-Gurevich SDK
 Mikoyan-Gurevich SF
 Mikoyan-Gurevich SG
 Mikoyan-Gurevich SI
 Mikoyan-Gurevich SL
 Mikoyan-Gurevich SM-1
 Mikoyan-Gurevich SM-2
 Mikoyan-Gurevich SM-9
 Mikoyan-Gurevich SMR
 Mikoyan-Gurevich SN
 Mikoyan-Gurevich SO
 Mikoyan-Gurevich SP-1
 Mikoyan-Gurevich SP
 Mikoyan-Gurevich SR
 Mikoyan-Gurevich SSh
 Mikoyan-Gurevich ST
 Mikoyan-Gurevich SU
 Mikoyan-Gurevich SV
 Mikoyan-Gurevich SYa
 Mikoyan-Gurevich SYe
 Mikoyan-Gurevich T
 Mikoyan-Gurevich Ye-1
 Mikoyan-Gurevich Ye-2
 Mikoyan-Gurevich Ye-4
 Mikoyan-Gurevich Ye-5
 Mikoyan-Gurevich Ye-6
 Mikoyan-Gurevich Ye-7
 Mikoyan-Gurevich Ye-8
 Mikoyan-Gurevich Ye-9
 Mikoyan-Gurevich Ye-23DPD
 Mikoyan-Gurevich Ye-23IG
 Mikoyan-Gurevich Ye-26
 Mikoyan-Gurevich Ye-33
 Mikoyan-Gurevich Ye-50
 Mikoyan-Gurevich Ye-66
 Mikoyan-Gurevich Ye-150
 Mikoyan-Gurevich Ye-151
 Mikoyan-Gurevich Ye-152
 Mikoyan-Gurevich Ye-152A
 Mikoyan-Gurevich Ye-152M
 Mikoyan-Gurevich Ye-152P
 Mikoyan-Gurevich Ye-155
 Mikoyan-Gurevich Ye-166
 Mikoyan-Gurevich Ye-266
 Mikoyan-Gurevich Zh
 Mikoyan-Gurevich 1.42
 Mikoyan-Gurevich 1.44

Mil 
 Mil A-10
 Mil Mi-1
 Mil Mi-2
 Mil Mi-3
 Mil Mi-4
 Mil Mi-6
 Mil Mi-8
 Mil Mi-9
 Mil Mi-10
 Mil Mi-14
 Mil Mi-17
 Mil Mi-18
 Mil Mi-24
 Mil Mi-26
 Mil Mi-28
 Mil Mi-30
 Mil Mi-34
 Mil Mi-36
 Mil Mi-38
 Mil Mi-42
 Mil Mi-54
 Mil Mi-58
 Mil Mi-60
 Mil V-5
 Mil V-7
 Mil V-12
 Mil V-16
 Mil Mi-X1

Miles Happy 
(Miles Happy, 43387 Mannix Road, Newberry Springs, CA)
 Miles Happy Adventurer 2+2

Miles 
(Philips and Powis Aircraft, Miles Aircraft Ltd, FG Miles Ltd)
 Southern Martlet
 Metal Martlet
 Miles M.1 Satyr
 Miles M.2 Hawk
 Miles M.2 Hawk Trainer
 Miles M.2 Hawk Major
 Miles M.3A Falcon Major
 Miles M.3B Falcon Six
 Miles M.4 Merlin
 Miles M.5 Sparrowhawk
 Miles M.6 Hawcon
 Miles M.7 Nighthawk
 Miles M.8 Peregrine
 Miles M.9 Kestrel
 Miles M.9A Master
 Miles M.11 Whitney Straight
 Miles M.11C
 Miles M.12 Mohawk
 Miles M.13 Hobby
 Miles M.14 Magister
 Miles M.14 Hawk Trainer III
 Miles M.15 Trainer
 Miles M.16 Mentor
 Miles M.17 Monarch
 Miles M.18
 Miles M.19 Master II
 Miles M.20
 Miles M.24 Master Fighter
 Miles Martinet
 Miles M.26 'X'
 Miles M.27 Master III
 Miles M.28 Mercury
 Miles M.30 'X Minor'
 Miles M.33 Monitor
 Miles M.35 Libellula
 Miles M.37 Martinet Trainer
 Miles M.38 Messenger
 Miles M.39B Libellula Libellula
 Miles M.50 Queen Martinet
 Miles M.52
 Miles M.57 Aerovan
 Miles M.60 Marathon
 Miles M.64 L.R.5
 Miles M.65 Gemini
 Miles M.68 Boxcar
 Miles M.69 Marathon II
 Miles M.71 Merchantman
 Miles M.75 Aries
 Miles M.76
 Miles M.77 Sparrowjet
 Miles M.100 Student
 Miles M.218
 Miles M.242 taken on by Beagle as the Beagle M.242
 Hurel-Dubois Miles HDM.105, with Societe des Avions Hurel-Dubois

Miles & Atwood 
(Leland Miles & Leon Atwood (built by Larry Brown), Los Angeles, CA)
 Miles & Atwood Special Miss Tulsa

Milford 
(Dale Milford, TX)
 Milford Buckaroo

Milholland 
 Milholland Legal Eagle

Military Aircraft 
(Miller Aviation Corporation)
 Military Aircraft HM-1

Militi 
Bruno Militi()
 Militi M.B.1
 Militi M.B.2 Leonardo
 Militi MB.3 Leonardo
 Militi MB.4

Militky-Brditschka
(Fred Militky / H.W. Brditschka OHG)
 Militky-Brditschka MB-E1

Mill Basin 
(Mill Basin Aircraft Corp, Brooklyn, NY)
 Mill Basin Aircraft Super Gull W-1

Millennium Aircraft 
(Compact Compositi srl)
 Millennium Master

Millennium Helicopter 
(United States)
 Millennium MH-1

Miller 
(Aeroneering Inc, Savannah, GA)
 Miller Lil' Rascal
 Miller Red Bare-un

Miller 
(Lestere Miller, Dallas, TX)
 Miller 1910 Biplane

Miller 
(Dewey F Miller, Denver, CO)
 Miller 1926 Biplane

Miller 
(Eugene M Miller, Longmont, CO)
 Miller M-1

Miller 
(Henry Miller, Farmington, MI)
 Miller Special

Miller 
(W F Miller, Oneida, NY)
 Miller 1928 Monoplane
 Miller Sport

Miller 
(E Miller, Genesee, ID)
 Miller B

Miller
(Horrie Miller, Melbourne, Australia)
 Miller biplane

Miller 
(John Miller Corp, New Brunswick, NJ)
 Miller MC-A1

Miller 
(R F Miller, 611 Sampson St, Houston, TX)
 Miller 1930 Biplane

Miller 
(Lewis Miller, Bourbon, IN)
 Miller Model V

Miller 
(Erven A Miller, Milwaukee, WI)
 Miller 1938 Monoplane
 Miller 2
 Miller M-5 Belly Flopper
 Miller M-6 Twin

Miller 
( (Howell W) Miller Aviation Corp, Springfield, MA)
 Miller HM-1 a.k.a. Hawks HM-1
 Miller HM-2
 Miller HM-3
 Miller HM-4 Aerovel a.k.a. Moonship
 Miller HM-5
 Miller Z-1
 Miller Z-2
 Miller Z-3 Zeta
 Miller MAC-1

Miller 
(James W Miller, Springfield, MA)
 Miller GEM-260
 Miller Jet Profile Twin Comanche 200
 Miller JM-1 Ole Tiger  Texas Gem
 Miller JM-2
 Miller Special

Miller 
(Paul K Miller, Los Angeles, CA)
 Miller M-1

Miller 
(International Aircraft Mfg Inc (Inter-Air))
 Miller 260A

Miller 
(Ray Miller, Tulsa, OK)
 Miller Special a.k.a. Fly Rod

Miller 
(William Y Miller, Mesa, AZ)
 Miller WM-2 a.k.a. Sport Plane

Miller 
(Paul K Miller, Los Angeles, CA)
 Miller M-1

Miller-Bohannon 
(Jim W Miller and Bruce Bohannon)
 Miller-Bohannon JM-2 Pushy Galore

Miller-Brown
(Roy G. Miller and D. T. Brown / Naval Aircraft Factory, Navy Yard, Philadelphia, PA)
 Miller-Brown Turkey Buzzard

Miller-Ybarra 
(Guy Miller & Guy Ybarra, Pittsburgh, PA)
 Miller-Ybarra Model 1

Millet-Lagarde 
 Millet Lagarde ML-10

Millicer 
 Millicer M10 AirTourer

Milliken 
(William Milliken Jr, Old Town, ME)
 Milliken M-1

Mills 
(Frank Mills, South Beach, Staten Island, NY)
 Mills 1915 Biplane

Milon 
(Pierre Milon / Aéro-club de Brive)
 Milon-Brive PMB.78 le Faucon

Minié 
(Société Minié Aéronautiques)
 Minié Emouchet Escopette

Minié 
(Société d'Études Victor Minié Aéronautiques)
See: SEVIMIA

Mini-Fly GmbH
(Kirchardt, Germany)
Mini-Fly Set

Minges 
(Richard Minges)
 Minges M-30 Special

Minina 
(Gérard Minina)
 Minina MG.2 Harmattan
 Minina MG.3 Harmattan

Mini-Hawk 
(Mini-Hawk Intl (Thomas E Maloney, William B Taylor, E Y Treffinger), Santa Monica, CA)
 Mini-Hawk I
 Mini-Hawk Tiger-Hawk

Minty 
(E.R. Minty)
 Minty Skyhook Mini Chopper

MIP
(Gustaw Mokrzycki, Ludwig Moczarski, Jan Idzkowski & Jerzy Ploszajski / Warsaw Technical High School)
 MIP Smyk

Mira 
(Virgilio Mira)
 Mira Golondrina I
 Mira Golondrina II
 Mira Golondrina III
 Mira Golondrina IV

Mirage 
(Mirage Aircraft Corporation (Pres: Larry Burton), Prescott Valley, AZ)
 Mirage Celerity
 Mirage Marathon

Mirouze 
(Alain Mirouze)
 Mirouze AM.1 Pulsar

von Mises 
 Mises R.I

Mississippi State University 
 Mississippi AZ-1 Marvelette
 Mississippi V-11 Marvel
 Mississippi MA-18B Marvelette
 MSU-Honda MH-01
 MSU-Honda MH-02

MIT 
(Massachusetts Institute of Technology, Cambridge, MA, Aeronautics and Astronautics Department)
 MIT Daedalus (Human powered aircraft)
 MIT Light Eagle
 MIT Daedalus 87
 MIT Daedalus 88
 MIT Monarch
 MIT Monarch-B
 MIT Chrysalis

Mitchell 
(Mitchell Aircraft Corp, Porterville, CA)
 Mitchell Wing A-10
 Mitchell Wing B-10
 Mitchell U-2 Superwing
 Mitchell Wing P-38

Mitchell 
(Grover Mitchell, Manchester, CT)
 Mitchell Kitalina

Mitrović 
(Milenko Mitrović-Spirta)
 Mitrović MMS-3

Mitsubishi 
(Mitsubishi Kokuki KK – Mitsubishi Aircraft Corporation) (Mitsubishi Shokai (三菱商会))
 CRJ Series Aircraft (following the acquisition of the program from Bombardier in 2020)
 CRJ200
 CRJ700
 CRJ900
 CRJ1000
 Mitsubishi 1MF1
 Mitsubishi 1MF1A
 Mitsubishi 1MF2
 Mitsubishi 1MF3
 Mitsubishi 1MF4
 Mitsubishi 1MF5A
 Mitsubishi 1MF9
 Mitsubishi 1MF10
 Mitsubishi 1MT
 Mitsubishi 2MB1
 Mitsubishi 2MB2
 Mitsubishi 2MR
 Mitsubishi 2MR7
 Mitsubishi 2MR8
 Mitsubishi 2MRT
 Mitsubishi 2MR5
 Mitsubishi 2MS1
 Mitsubishi 2MT
 Mitsubishi 3MT
 Mitsubishi 3MT5
 Mitsubishi 3MT10
 Mitsubishi 4MS1
 Mitsubishi-Hanriot 28 Trainer
 Mitsubishi Igo-1-A
 Mitsubishi R-1.2 Trainer
 Mitsubishi R-2.2 Trainer
 Mitsubishi R-4 Survey Aircraft
 Mitsubishi F3B1 Trainer
 Mitsubishi Tora Long-range Aircraft
 Mitsubishi T-1.2 Converted Aeroplane
 Mitsubishi Hibari Trainer
 Mitsubishi Tombo Trainer
 Mitsubishi Ka-8
 Mitsubishi Ka-9
 Mitsubishi Ka-12
 Mitsubishi Ka-14
 Mitsubishi ATD-X
 Mitsubishi F-1
 Mitsubishi F-2
 Mitsubishi F-3
 Mitsubishi X-2 Shinshin
 Mitsubishi H-60
 Mitsubishi MC-1
 Mitsubishi MC-20
 Mitsubishi MH2000
 Mitsubishi MS-1
 Mitsubishi Hato Survey Aircraft
 Mitsubishi Hinazuru Passenger Transport
 Mitsubishi Ohtori
 Mitsubishi Regional Jet
 Mitsubishi SpaceJet
 Mitsubishi MU-2
 Mitsubishi Mu-300
 Mitsubishi RP-1
 Mitsubishi SX-3
 Mitsubishi T-2
 Mitsubishi A5M
 Mitsubishi A6M Zero Rei-sen
 Mitsubishi A7M Reppu
 Mitsubishi A7M3-J Reppu Kai
 Mitsubishi B1M
 Mitsubishi B2M
 Mitsubishi B4M
 Mitsubishi B5M
 Mitsubishi C1M
 Mitsubishi C5M
 Mitsubishi D3M
 Mitsubishi F1M
 Mitsubishi G1M
 Mitsubishi G3M
 Mitsubishi G4M
 Mitsubishi G4M1 Bomber
 Mitsubishi G6M
 Mitsubishi G7M Taizan
 Mitsubishi J2M Raiden
 Mitsubishi J4M Senden
 Mitsubishi J8M Shusui
 Mitsubishi K3M
 Mitsubishi K6M
 Mitsubishi K7M
 Mitsubishi L4M
 Mitsubishi Q2M Taiyō
 Mitsubishi Ki-1
 Mitsubishi Ki-2
 Mitsubishi Ki-7
 Mitsubishi Ki-14
 Mitsubishi Ki-15
 Mitsubishi Ki-18
 Mitsubishi Ki-20
 Mitsubishi Ki-21
 Mitsubishi Ki-30
 Mitsubishi Ki-33
 Mitsubishi Ki-39
 Mitsubishi Ki-40
 Mitsubishi Ki-46
 Mitsubishi Ki-51
 Mitsubishi Ki-57
 Mitsubishi Ki-67 Hiryu
 Mitsubishi Ki-69
 Mitsubishi Ki-71
 Mitsubishi Ki-73
 Mitsubishi Ki-83
 Mitsubishi Ki-95
 Mitsubishi Ki-97
 Mitsubishi Ki-103
 Mitsubishi Ki-109
 Mitsubishi Ki-112
 Mitsubishi Ki-200
 Mitsubishi Experimental Type R.2
 Mitsubishi Experimental Taka-type Carrier Fighter
 Mitsubishi Experimental Washi-type Light Bomber
 Mitsubishi Experimental Tobi-type Reconnaissance Aircraft
 Mitsubishi Experimental Hayabusa-type Fighter
 Mitsubishi Experimental Short-range Reconnaissance Aircraft
 Mitsubishi Experimental Special-purpose Carrier Reconnaissance Aircraft
 Mitsubishi Army Experimental 9-shi Fighter
 Mitsubishi Army Type Ko 1 Trainer
 Mitsubishi Army Type Ki 1 Trainer
 Mitsubishi Army Type 87 Light Bomber
 Mitsubishi Army Type 92 Heavy Bomber
 Mitsubishi Army Type 92 Reconnaissance Aircraft
 Mitsubishi Army Type 93-1 Heavy Bomber
 Mitsubishi Army Type 93-2 Heavy Bomber
 Mitsubishi Army Type 93-1 Twin-engine Light Bomber
 Mitsubishi Army Type 93-2 Twin-engined Light Bomber
 Mitsubishi Army Type 97 Reconnaissance Aircraft
 Mitsubishi Army Type 97 Heavy Bomber
 Mitsubishi Army Type 97 Light Bomber
 Mitsubishi Army Type 99 Assault Aircraft
 Mitsubishi Army Type 100 Transport Aircraft
 Mitsubishi Army Type 100 Command Reconnaissance Aircraft
 Mitsubishi Army Type 100 Operations Trainer
 Mitsubishi Army Type 100 Air Defence Fighter
 Mitsubishi Army Type 100 Assault Aircraft
 Mitsubishi Army Type 4 Heavy Bomber
 Mitsubishi Army Type 4 Special Attack Aircraft
 Mitsubishi Navy Experimental 7-Shi Carrier Torpedo Bomber
 Mitsubishi Navy Experimental 7-Shi Carrier Attack Aircraft
 Mitsubishi Navy Experimental 7-Shi Carrier Attack Bomber
 Mitsubishi Navy Experimental 7-Shi Twin-engine Carrier Aircraft
 Mitsubishi Navy Experimental 7-Shi Carrier Fighter
 Mitsubishi Navy Experimental 8-Shi Two-seat Fighter
 Mitsubishi Navy Experimental 8-Shi Special Reconnaissance Aircraft
 Mitsubishi Navy Experimental 8-Shi Carrier Fighter
 Mitsubishi Navy Experimental 8-shi Land based Medium Attack Aircraft
 Mitsubishi Navy Experimental 9-Shi Carrier Single-seat Fighter
 Mitsubishi Navy Experimental 9-Shi Single-seat Fighter
 Mitsubishi Navy Experimental 9-Shi Carrier Attack Bomber
 Mitsubishi Navy Experimental 9-Shi Carrier Torpedo Attacker
 Mitsubishi Navy Experimental 9-Shi Land-based Attack Bomber
 Mitsubishi Navy Experimental 10-Shi Carrier Torpedo Attacker
 Mitsubishi Navy Experimental 10-Shi Observation Seaplane
 Mitsubishi Navy Experimental 11-shi Carrier Bomber
 Mitsubishi Navy Experimental 11-shi Crew Trainer
 Mitsubishi Navy Experimental 12-Shi Carrier Fighter
 Mitsubishi Navy Experimental 12-Shi Land-based Attack Aircraft
 Mitsubishi Navy Experimental 14-Shi Interceptor Fighter
 Mitsubishi Navy Experimental 16-shi Attack Bomber Taizan
 Mitsubishi Navy Experimental 17-shi Ko (A) Type Carrier Fighter Reppu
 Mitsubishi Navy Experimental 17-shi Otsu (B) Type Interceptor Fighter Senden
 Mitsubishi Navy Experimental 19-shi Rocket-Powered Interceptor Fighter Shusui
 Mitsubishi Navy Experimental 19-shi Patrol Aircraft Taiyo
 Mitsubishi Navy Experimental 20-shi Ko (A) Type Carrier Fighter Rifuku
 Mitsubishi Navy Type 10 Carrier Fighter
 Mitsubishi Navy Type 10 Carrier Attacker
 Mitsubishi Navy Type 10 Carrier reconnaissance Aircraft
 Mitsubishi Navy Type 13-2 Carrier Attacker
 Mitsubishi Navy Type 13-3 Carrier Attacker
 Mitsubishi Navy Type 87 Light Bomber
 Mitsubishi Navy Type 89-1 Carrier Attacker
 Mitsubishi Navy Type 89-2 Carrier Attacker
 Mitsubishi Navy Type 90-1 Crew Trainer
 Mitsubishi Navy Type 90 Land Transport
 Mitsubishi Navy Type 93 Attack Bomber
 Mitsubishi Navy Type 93 Land-Based Attack Bomber
 Mitsubishi Navy Type 96 Model 11 Carrier Fighter
 Mitsubishi Navy Type 96 Fighter – Trainer
 Mitsubishi Navy Type 96 Land-based Attack Aircraft "Rikko"
 Mitsubishi Navy Type 97-2 Carrier Attacker
 Mitsubishi Navy Type 97 Attack Bomber
 Mitsubishi Navy Type 98 Reconnaissance Aircraft
 Mitsubishi Navy Type 0 Carrier Fighter
 Mitsubishi Navy Type 0 Fighter-Trainer
 Mitsubishi Navy Type 0 Observation Seaplane
 Mitsubishi Navy Type 0 Transport
 Mitsubishi Navy Type 1 Attack Bomber
 Mitsubishi Navy Type 1 Wingtip Convoy Fighter
 Mitsubishi Navy Type 1 Large Land Trainer
 Mitsubishi Navy Type 1 Transport
 Mitsubishi Navy Type 2 Training Fighter
 Mitsubishi Navy Training Fighter
 Mitsubishi Navy Interceptor Fighter Raiden
 Mitsubishi Navy Torpedo Bomber Yasukuni

Mix 
(Arthur "Bert" Mix, Chicago, IL)
 Mix Flying Arrow

Mizuno 
 Mizuno Type 1 suicide rocket glider Shinryū
 Mizuno Type 2 rocket interceptor Shinryū
 Mizuno MXZ1
 Mizuno Navy 17-shi Experimental Plane

References

Further reading

External links 

 List of Aircraft (M)

fr:Liste des aéronefs (I-M)